Sherry Jones (born in Nashville, Tennessee) is an American politician and a Democratic member of the Tennessee House of Representatives representing District 59 since January 1995.

Electoral history
1994 Jones was initially elected in the 1994 Democratic Primary and November 8, 1994 General election.
1996 Jones was unopposed for the 1996 Democratic Primary and won the November 5, 1996 General election against Republican nominee Joe Allison.
1998 Jones was unopposed for both the August 6, 1998 Democratic Primary, winning with 1,529 votes, and the November 3, 1998 General election, winning with 4,627 votes.
2000 Jones was unopposed for both the August 3, 2000 Democratic Primary, winning with 779 votes, and the November 7, 2000 General election, winning with 13,402 votes.
2002 Jones was unopposed for the August 1, 2002 Democratic Primary, winning with 3,527 votes, and won the November 5, 2002 General election with 7,165 votes (65.3%) against Republican nominee B. J. Brown.
2004 Jones was challenged in the three-way August 5, 2004 Democratic Primary, winning with 873 votes (73.1%), and was unopposed for the November 2, 2004 General election, winning with 14,683 votes.
2006 Jones was challenged in the August 3, 2006 Democratic Primary, winning with 1,477 votes (54.7%), and won the November 7, 2006 General election with 7,960 votes (71.1%) against Republican nominee Mike Meadows.
2008 Jones was unopposed for both the August 7, 2008 Democratic Primary, winning with 643 votes, and the November 4, 2008 General election, winning with 14,528 votes.
2010 Jones was unopposed for the August 5, 2010 Democratic Primary, and won the November 2, 2010 General election, winning with 6,023 votes (62.7%) against Republican nominee Duane Dominy and a write-in candidate.
2012 Jones was unopposed for the August 2, 2012 Democratic Primary, winning with 1,271 votes, and won the November 6, 2012 General election with 11,358 votes (70.1%) against Republican nominee Robert Duvall.

References

External links
Official page at the Tennessee General Assembly
Campaign site

Sherry Jones at Ballotpedia
Sherry Jones at OpenSecrets

Year of birth missing (living people)
Living people
Democratic Party members of the Tennessee House of Representatives
Politicians from Nashville, Tennessee
Women state legislators in Tennessee
21st-century American politicians
21st-century American women politicians